The Hunters Hill Rugby Club, is an Australian amateur rugby union club based in Hunters Hill, New South Wales. The club currently fields six teams in the NSW Suburban Rugby Union competition, known as "Subbies".  Hunters Hill was formed in 1892, and is amongst the oldest rugby clubs in Australia.

The club aims to achieve a balance of success and camaraderie on and off the field as well as encouraging people all of ages and genders to enjoy their rugby. As of 2017, Hunters Hill has won twelve Club Championships and forty one Premierships within the various divisions of the Subbies competition, including winning the trophy for the Division I premiership, the Kentwell Cup, eight times.

History

Early years: 1892–1914
Hunters Hill RUFC was founded in 1892. Sydney club rugby in the early years was organised on two levels, known simply as Senior and Junior, where Junior denoted second tier teams, not the age of the players. A Senior club competition had been running since 1874, but Junior contests prior to the mid-1880s were somewhat disorganised. There was no formal competition for 'Junior' clubs until 1886 and 
matches were agreed by arrangement of the clubs (or between schools and clubs).

The City and Suburban Association, formed in 1901, organised a competition for Junior clubs outside the jurisdiction of the Metropolitan and New South Wales Rugby Unions, and the Hunters Hill club joined this competition from at least as early as 1906. The club's present black and white hoops were adopted in 1907 but colours of dark blue and sky blue were used from the mid-1890s.

Subbies: 1919–1956
Following the re-establishment of New South Wales rugby in 1919 after the war, a new combined competition formed. Hunters Hill won the premiership for non-district clubs in 1919. At the beginning of the 1923 season, W.H. Kentwell, president of the Mosman Rugby Club, presented the Kentwell Cup perpetual trophy for what was effectively the first grade competition of the non-district clubs at the time. Eight teams competed in 1923 and the cup was won by Mosman with Hunters Hill as the runners-up. Hunters Hill played the finals in 1930 and 1932, and again in 1938 – but were not to win the Kentwell Cup until 1972. The club did however win the second grade finals of 1925 and 1926 for the G.B. Burke Cup.

After the war, Hunters Hill won the G.B. Burke Cup again in 1955. The club won the H.W. Whiddon Cup for the third grade competition, in 1949, 1951, and 1955. The club fell away, however, and no senior rugby sides were fielded for nine seasons from 1957. Outside of the World Wars this was the senior club's only break of continuity, but the junior club had remained strong with up to ten teams playing.

Comeback and Golden era: 1966–1991
In 1966, Hunters Hill made a return to Subbies and over the next six years expanded from one senior team to three. The club won the Division II first grade in 1971 for the John Barraclough Cup (as well as the Reliance Shield club championship) and fielded four teams after promotion to Division I in 1972. Coached by former the NSW and Wallaby player John Francis, the club achieved immediate success by winning the Division I first grade premiership in 1972 for the Kentwell Cup.

Through the 1970s and 1980s, Hunters Hill had a golden period in Division I, securing Kentwell Cup victories in 1972, 1977–79, 1981, and 1987. The club won the Bruce Graham Shield four times for the Division I Club Championship in 1977, 1979–81, and 1987. Eventually the club was relegated to Division II in 1991.

Centenary and regrowth: 1992 to 2010
Hunter's Hill undertook a recruitment drive to boost playing members ahead of the Club's centenary in 1992. In that season, the first grade team wore jerseys which incorporated the two blue colours from the 1900s. The Hunters Hill club also travelled to the Hong Kong Sevens tournament. In 1994, "The Cats" team for over-35s was formed. The club gained promotion to Division I for the 1995 season. A colts team was also formed in 1995, and the club entered and won the NSW Sevens tournament. The Hunters Hill club moved up and down between divisions. The 1st Grade side tasted success in 1995 and 1997, winning the Division I 'Kentwell Cup'.

Recent times: 2010 to present
In 2011, Hunters Hill won the interdivisional Cowboy Cup, as well as the Division II Club Champions Reliance Shield and first grade John Barraclough Cup, to gain promotion once again to Division I in 2012.

In 2016, Hunters Hill won the Subbies 7's Tournament, beating Blacktown 15–5 in the final, before claiming the Barraclough Cup once again as the first grade premiers in Division II.

2017 saw all four senior grades participate in the finals, with 1st grade and 3rd grade claiming the minor premierships. Hunter's Hill was awarded the Division II Club Champions Reliance Shield.  This success has provided Hunters Hill promotion to Tier I for the 2018 season.

NSW Suburban Rugby Union Premierships 
Hunters Hill has won club championship and premiership titles across multiple competitions since 1919:

Club Championships

Interdivisional
2011 - Interdivisional Club Champions: Cowboy Cup

Division I
1987 - Club Champions: Bruce Graham Shield,
1981 - Club Champions: Bruce Graham Shield
1980 - Club Champions: Bruce Graham Shield
1979 - Club Champions: Bruce Graham Shield

Division II
2020 - Club Champions: Reliance Shield  
2017 - Club Champions: Reliance Shield
2011 - Club Champions: Reliance Shield
1994 - Club Champions: Reliance Shield
1993 - Club Champions: Reliance Shield

Division III
2009 - Club Champions: Doc Harris Shield

Premierships

Division I

2000 - Colts Barbour Cup (Joint Premiers: Old Ignatians)
1997 - 1st Grade Kentwell Cup
1995 - 1st Grade Kentwell Cup
1987 - 1st Grade Kentwell Cup, 2nd Grade Burke Cup
1986 - 3rd Grade Whiddon Cup
1985 - 4th Grade Judd Cup
1983 - 3rd Grade Whiddon Cup, 4th Grade Judd Cup
1982 - 3rd Grade Whiddon Cup
1981 - 1st Grade Kentwell Cup
1980 - 2nd Grade Burke Cup, 3rd Grade Whiddon Cup, 4th Grade Judd Cup

1979 - 1st Grade Kentwell Cup, 4th Grade Judd Cup
1978 - 1st Grade Kentwell Cup, 3rd Grade Whiddon Cup
1977 - 1st Grade Kentwell Cup*, 2nd Grade Burke Cup, 3rd Grade Whiddon Cup 
1972 - 1st Grade Kentwell Cup
1969 - 3rd Grade Whiddon Cup
1955 - 3rd Grade Whiddon Cup
1954 - 2nd Grade Burke Cup
1951 - 3rd Grade Whiddon Cup
1949 - 3rd Grade Whiddon Cup

Division II

2020 - 1st Grade Barraclough Cup,  2nd Grade Stockdale Cup, 
2019 - 2nd Grade Stockdale Cup, 4th Grade Richardson Cup
2017 - 1st Grade Minor Premiers, 3rd Grade - Blunt Cup;
2016 - 1st Grade Barraclough Cup
2011 - 1st Grade Barraclough Cup
2010 - 2nd Grade Stockdale Cup, 4th Grade Richardson Cup

1994 - 3rd Grade Blunt Cup
1992 - 2nd Grade Stockdale Cup

Division III
2005 - 4th Grade Nicholson Cup, Colts Rugby Club Cup
2008 - 4th Grade Nicholson Cup

NSWRU: Reserve Grade B division
1926  - 2nd Grade Burke Cup*
1925  - 2nd Grade Burke Cup (Joint Premiers: Briars)
1919  - 1st Grade Premiers

Subbies Preseason 7s
2019 - Cup Winner
2017 - Cup Winner

Notes:

* indicates undefeated season.

Notable players
Hunters Hill players who have gone on to gain international or provincial caps:
 Andrew Kellaway –  and New South Wales
 Sosene Anesi – ex-All Black.
 Angus Bell –  and New South Wales.
 Will Harris – New South Wales.

References

Sources

 

 Hickie, Tom V: The Game for the Game Itself!: The Development of Sub-District Rugby in Sydney, (1983) Sydney Sub-District Rugby Union. 
 Mulford, John G:  Guardians of the Game: The History of the New South Wales Rugby Union 1874-2004. (2005) ABC Books. 
 Pollard, Jack: Australian Rugby: The game and the players. (1994) Pan Macmillan.

External links 
Hunters Hill Rugby official site
Hunters Hill Junior Rugby website

Rugby union teams in Sydney
Rugby clubs established in 1882
1882 establishments in Australia
Municipality of Hunter's Hill
Hunters Hill, New South Wales